The 2008 NORCECA Beach Volleyball Circuit is a North American beach volleyball tour.
The tour consists of seven tournaments with both genders.

Tournaments
 Presidente Light Boca Chica Tournament, in Boca Chica, Dominican Republic – 19–24 March 2008
 Guatemala Beach Volleyball Tournament, in Guatemala City, Guatemala – 16–21 April 2008
 El Salvador Beach Volleyball Tournament, in San Salvador, El Salvador – 23–28 April 2008
 Maeva Manzanillo Beach Volleyball Tournament, in Manzanillo, Colima, Mexico – 30 April – 5 May 2008
 Guadalajara Beach Volleyball Tournament, in Guadalajara, Mexico – 7–12 May 2008
 Coors Light Carolina Beach Volleyball Tournament, in Carolina, Puerto Rico – 21–26 May 2008
 Final Leg, in Port of Spain, Trinidad and Tobago – May 29 – June 2, 2008 (Canceled)

Tournament results

Women

Men

Medal table by country
Medal table as of June 5, 2008.

References

 
North American
2008